Colonel Muktar Hussein Afrah is an officer in the army of the Transitional Federal Government of Somalia.

He was commander of forces in Beledweyne after the Battle of Beledweyne. On January 7, 2007 he was arrested by Ethiopian troops for releasing Islamic Court Union (ICU) leader Sheik Farah Moalim Mohammed, based on the written authority of local elders, setting off controversy and violent protests. Ethiopian troops demanded the ICU leader be turned over to them. He was released on January 10, 2010.

References

Living people
Somalian military leaders
Ethnic Somali people
Year of birth missing (living people)
People from Beledweyne